This is a list of yearly Sun Belt Conference football champions. Co-champions are listed in alphabetical order. From 2001 to 2017, there had not been a tie breaker for conference champions. Since 2018, an outright conference champion is determined by the Sun Belt Conference Football Championship Game.

Schools are listed by their current athletic branding, not necessarily what they used in a given season.

Champions by year

Pre-championship game era (2001–2017)

Sun Belt Conference Championship Game (2018–present)

† 2020 game canceled due to COVID-19 pandemic.

Championships by team

 Bold indicates an outright title.
Italics indicate team is no longer a member of the Sun Belt Conference.

See also
 List of Sun Belt Conference football standings

References

Sun Belt Conference
Champions